Lulama Masikazana (6 February 1973 – 7 October 2011) was a South African cricketer who played first-class cricket as a wicketkeeper for Eastern Province from 1993 to 2000.

He was born in Port Elizabeth.  As a schoolboy in 1991, he was one of the first black players to play for the South African Schools cricket team, in a team which included future Test cricketers Shaun Pollock, Herschelle Gibbs and Nicky Boje.

He made his first-class debut in November 1993 playing as wicketkeeper for the Eastern Province B team against Boland B in the UCB Bowl.  In 38 first-class matches, mainly for Eastern Province or Eastern Province B, He scored one first-class half-century, dismissed for exactly 50 against Boland in November 1997, and took 111 dismissals, including 10 stumpings.   He also took 23 dismissals in 24 List A one-day matches.

He died in Port Elizabeth after a sudden illness, 4 months short of his 39th birthday.

Notes

External links
 Profile, ESPNcricinfo
 Profile, CricketArchive
 Former Eastern Province keeper dies aged 38, ESPNcricinfo, 10 October 2011

1973 births
2011 deaths
Eastern Province cricketers
Cricketers from Port Elizabeth
South African cricketers
Wicket-keepers
Afrikaner people